is a Japanese retired track and field sprinter who specialized in the 100 metres. She competed in the 4 × 100 meters relay at the 2011 World Championships without qualifying for the final. She also won a gold medal in the 4 × 100 metres relay at the 2011 Asian Championships, with teammates Momoko Takahashi, Chisato Fukushima and Saori Imai.

Personal bests

International competition

References

External links

Nao Okabe at JAAF 

1988 births
Living people
Japanese female sprinters
Sportspeople from Chiba Prefecture
World Athletics Championships athletes for Japan
University of Tsukuba alumni